Allegany is the name of several places in the United States:

Communities
 Allegany County, Maryland
Allegany College of Maryland
 Allegany County, New York
 Allegany (town), New York, in Cattaraugus County
Allegany (village), New York, in the above town
 Allegany Indian Reservation, in Cattaraugus County, New York
 Allegany State Park, a New York state park in Cattaraugus County on the Pennsylvania border
 Allegany, Oregon, an unincorporated community in Coos County
 Allegany Township, Potter County, Pennsylvania

Other
 Allegany Ballistics Laboratory

See also

Allegheny (disambiguation)